Jacques Nihoul (6 June 1937 – 6 May 2021) was a Belgian scientist and professor emeritus of the Faculty of Science of the University of Liège. He was the director of the DEA Européen en Modélisation de l'Environnement marin. In 1978, he was awarded the Francqui Prize on Biological and Medical Sciences. He signed the Manifesto for Walloon culture in 1983.

References

External links
 DEA Européen en Modélisation de l'Environnement marin

1937 births
2021 deaths
Belgian biologists
Walloon movement activists
University of Liège alumni
Massachusetts Institute of Technology alumni
Alumni of the University of Cambridge
Academic staff of the University of Liège
People from Ans, Belgium